Arsen (in Armenian, Արսեն; Georgian, არსენ; Russian, ; Ukrainian) is a given name, a diminutive of Greek Arsenios. Notable people with the name include:
Arsen Akayev (born 1970), Kumyk-Russian professional football coach and a former player
Arsen Avakov (born 1964), Ukrainian politician
Arsen Avakov (born 1971), former Tajik football player
Arsen Avetisyan (born 1973), Armenian football player
Arsen Balabekyan (born 1986), Armenian football striker
Arsen Beglaryan (born 1993), Armenian football player
Arsen Dedić (1938–2015), Croatian singer-songwriter, musician and composer and a poet
Arsen Fadzayev (born 1962), former Soviet wrestler, world champion and Olympic champion in freestyle wrestling
Arsen Gasparian, former Armenian press secretary, publisher and cigar manufacturer
Arsen Gitinov (born 1977), male freestyle wrestler from Kyrgyzstan
Arsen Goshokov (born 1991), Russian footballer
Arsen Kanokov (born 1957), President of Kabardino-Balkaria
Arsen Karađorđević (1859–1938), Serbian royalty
Arsen Kasabiev (born 1987), Georgian weightlifter of Ossetian origin
Arsen Kotsoyev (1872–1944), one of the founders of Ossetic prose
Arsen Martirosian (born 1977), Armenian super bantamweight boxer
Arsen Mekokishvili (1912–1972), Georgian Soviet wrestler and Olympic champion in Freestyle wrestling
Arsen Melikyan (born 1976), Armenian weightlifter and Olympic medallist
Arsen Minasian (1916–1977), founder of Gilan's sanatorium in 1954, the first modern sanatorium in Iran
Arsen Papikyan (born 1972), Russian professional football coach and a former player
Arsen Roulette (born 1976), American singer, lyricist, guitar player and upright bass player
Arsen Terteryan (1882–1953), Soviet Armenian literary critic, academic of Science Academy of Armenia
Arsen Tlekhugov (born 1976), Kazakh football forward
Raymonde Arsen, servant in the Comté de Foix in the early fourteenth century

Companies
Arsen (company), a Miami-based cigar company

See also
Arsenius (name)
Arsène
Arseni
Arsenović

Armenian masculine given names